Oh Jae-suk (or  ; born 4 January 1990) is a South Korean football player who currently plays as full-back for Incheon United in the K League 1.   He previously played for Suwon Samsung Bluewings and Gangwon FC in his homeland.   He has also represented his country at full international level.

Club career

Oh started out his professional career with Suwon Samsung Bluewings in 2010.   He made just 5 league appearances before being loaned to Gangwon FC for the majority of the 2011 season.   He played 22 matches and scored once as his side finished 16th and last in the final standings, however they retained their league status due to their being no relegation from the K-League that year.   He signed for Gangwon permanently in 2012 and made 31 league appearances to help them to a 14th-place finish, just above the relegation spots.

In 2013 he joined, then J2 League side, Gamba Osaka who had been relegated from J1 League the previous season.   His first year in Japan was spent largely as a reserve behind veteran right-back Akira Kaji and he made just 5 appearances as Gamba bounced back at the first time of asking, ending the season as J2 League champions.

2014 got even better for the men in blue and black as their return to J1 League saw them go on to win the domestic treble, lifting the J1 League title, the J.League Cup and the Emperor's Cup.   Kaji departed for America before the season and Oh saw himself in competition with the newly acquired Koki Yonekura for the right-back position and Hiroki Fujiharu for the left-back slot.   Due to a gruelling schedule, all 3 were rotated by coach Kenta Hasegawa throughout the year and Oh ended up making 37 appearances in all competitions.

Gamba retained their Emperor's Cup title in 2015 and added the Japanese Super Cup to their trophy cabinet, they also reached the semi-finals of the 2015 AFC Champions League before going down to Chinese outfit Guangzhou Evergrande over 2 legs.   Oh didn't feature nearly as much as he had the previous year as Yonekura and Fujiharu locked down the starting berths, he played just 10 times in the league and 22 games in total.  He was also red-carded in the league championship final play-off first leg at home to Sanfrecce Hiroshima.   With Gamba leading 2–1 in the 86th minute, Oh was shown a straight red-card.   They went on to concede injury time goals to Sho Sasaki and Yoshifumi Kashiwa and lost 3-2 before drawing the return leg 1-1 which led to a 4-3 aggregate defeat and Sanfrecce being crowned J League Champions.

There were to be no trophies for Gamba between 2016 and 2018, but Oh went on to feature regularly for them in that period despite fierce competition not only from Yonekura and Fujiharu but also from the up-and-coming Ryo Hatsuse.   Oh played 18, 29 and 24 league games respectively across the 2016, 2017 and 2018 seasons as Gamba finished in 4th, 10th and 9th positions.

International career

Oh played for the South Korean Olympic football team at the 2012 Summer Olympics, helping them to win the bronze medal.

He was called up to the senior South Korea team by Uli Stielike for a 2018 FIFA World Cup qualifier against Lebanon in March 2016, but had to withdraw through injury and was replaced by Kim Chang-soo.

Club career statistics 

 1 includes J.League Championship, Japanese Super Cup and Suruga Bank Championship appearances.

Reserves performance

Honors

Gamba Osaka 

J.League Division 1 – 2014
J.League Division 2 – 2013
Emperor's Cup – 2014, 2015
J.League Cup – 2014
Japanese Super Cup – 2015

References

External links 
 
 

1990 births
Living people
Association football defenders
South Korean footballers
South Korea under-17 international footballers
South Korea under-20 international footballers
South Korea under-23 international footballers
South Korea international footballers
South Korean expatriate footballers
Suwon Samsung Bluewings players
Gangwon FC players
Gamba Osaka players
Gamba Osaka U-23 players
FC Tokyo players
K League 1 players
J1 League players
J2 League players
J3 League players
Footballers at the 2012 Summer Olympics
Olympic footballers of South Korea
Olympic medalists in football
Olympic bronze medalists for South Korea
Expatriate footballers in Japan
South Korean expatriate sportspeople in Japan
Kyung Hee University alumni
Medalists at the 2012 Summer Olympics
Asian Games medalists in football
Footballers at the 2010 Asian Games
Asian Games bronze medalists for South Korea
Medalists at the 2010 Asian Games
People from Uijeongbu
Sportspeople from Gyeonggi Province